Izmail Airport  is a closed airport in the Odessa Oblast, Ukraine. It is located 4.5 km North of the city of Izmail. The airport operated from 2007 to 2009, but was closed and has not renewed its certification with the State Aviation Administration of Ukraine since being suspended for three years in 2010.

References

External links
General Airport Information

1944 establishments in Ukraine
2010 disestablishments in Ukraine
Buildings and structures in Odesa Oblast
Defunct airports in Ukraine